A nested loop join is a naive algorithm that joins two sets by using two nested loops. Join operations are important for database management.

Algorithm

 algorithm nested_loop_join is
     for each tuple r in R do
         for each tuple s in S do
             if r and s satisfy the join condition then
                 yield tuple <r,s>

This algorithm will involve  nr*bs+ br block transfers and nr+br seeks, where br and bs are number of blocks in relations R and S respectively, and nr is the number of tuples in relation R.

The block nested loop join algorithm is a generalization of the simple nested loops algorithm that takes advantage of additional memory to reduce the number of times that the  relation is scanned. It loads large chunks of relation R into main memory. For each chunk, it scans S and evaluates the join condition on all tuple pairs, currently in memory. This reduces the number of times S is scanned to once per chunk.

Index join variation
If the inner relation has an index on the attributes used in the join, then the naive nest loop join can be replaced with an index join.

 algorithm index_join is
     for each tuple r in R do
         for each tuple s in S in the index lookup do
             yield tuple <r,s>

The time complexity for this variation improves from

See also
Hash join
Sort-merge join

References

Join algorithms